Chaetoxanthones are bio-active xanthones isolated from marine-derived Chaetomium.

References

External links 
 Antiprotozoal Activities of Heterocyclic-Substituted Xanthones from the Marine-Derived Fungus Chaetomium sp.

Chaetomium
Xanthones